Kuhin (also Romanized as Kūhīn) is a city and capital of Kuhin District, in Qazvin County, Qazvin Province, Iran. At the 2006 census its population was 1,398, in 388 families. The people of Kuhin are Turks and speak Azerbaijani Turkish.

References 

Qazvin County
Cities in Qazvin Province